The Statesman is an Indian English-language broadsheet daily newspaper founded in 1875 and published simultaneously in Kolkata, New Delhi, Siliguri and Bhubaneswar. It incorporates and is directly descended from The Friend of India, founded in 1818. It is owned by The Statesman Ltd and headquartered at Statesman House, Chowringhee Square, Kolkata, with its national editorial office at Statesman House, Connaught Place, New Delhi. It is a member of the Asia News Network.

The Statesman has an average weekday circulation of approximately 148,000, and the Sunday Statesman has a circulation of 230,000. This ranks it as one of the leading English newspapers in West Bengal, India.

History
The Statesman is a direct descendant of two newspapers, the Bombay (now Mumbai) based Indian Statesman and The Friend of India published in Calcutta (now Kolkata). Indian Statesman was started  by Robert Knight, who was previously the principal founder and editor of The Times of India. Knight merged the two papers to The Statesman and New Friend of India on 15 January 1875. The paper later adopted the current name. It absorbed its erstwhile rival The Englishman in 1927. The Statesman was managed by a British corporate group until it transferred ownership to a consortium of companies with N A Palkhivala as Chairman in the mid-1960s. The first editor assigned under this new ownership was Pran Chopra.

Editorial style

The Statesman is characterized by its terse reporting style. It holds an Centre-Right position. It opposed the shifting of India's capital from Calcutta to New Delhi in 1911, stating that "[t]he British have gone to the city of graveyards to be buried there".  It also strenuously opposed Indira Gandhi's Emergency in 1975–77. Under the editor Ian Stephens (who was editor from 1942 to 1951), the newspaper published highly disturbing images, on 22 and 29 August 1943, of the effects of the Bengal famine of 1943, despite the British colonial government's attempts at censorship. The images played a major role in changing world opinion on imperialism.

The Statesman Award for Rural Reporting is presented to outstanding journalists every year, irrespective of affiliation, to further the social uplifting of indigents from India. The awards are presented on 16 September every year, the death anniversary of Justice Sudhi Ranjan Das, former Chief Justice of India's Supreme Court and chairman of The Statesman during the tumultuous Emergency years.

Once the most widely read English dailies in West Bengal, The Statesman has now lost some ground to The Telegraph, The Times of India and Hindustan Times in the state. But it is widely regarded as the paper to read for serious news reportage, incisive analytical articles and usage of standard English language.

The Statesman is a founding member of the Asia News Network, a grouping of 22 Asian newspapers that have joined hands for a daily news exchange. This allows The Statesman to offer exhaustive coverage of all Asian regions.

Supplements

The Statesman carries a Thursday feature supplement called "Section 2" which is published from New Delhi. The four-page supplement provides in-depth analysis on art, dance, literature, drama, fashion, lifestyle and entertainment. In Kolkata, the supplement "Voices" focuses on schools and schoolchildren. It started in 1995, providing the opportunity for school children to showcase their writing skills with research articles, poems and short news clips. Among other activities every year, "Voices" hosts a 2-day long festival called "Vibes" in Calcutta, which showcases inter-school competitions in different fields, as well as shows by musicians and bands.

The Sunday supplement, "8th Day", is the major literary section of the paper, consisting of reader-contributed short stories and poems while the other Sunday supplement, "Evolve", mainly deals with the cultural scene in India. "Marquee", published every Saturday, covers the film and entertainment scene. Supplement of Dainik Statesman - every Saturday publishes Binodan where the news of art, culture, music, entertainment, food, fashion, lifestyle related articles are available . Every Sunday publishes Bichitra where the Sunday special articles, short stories, travel, children special issues are available.

Key personnel
R P Gupta is Chairman and Ravindra Kumar is Editor of The Statesman. Arya Rudra is Managing Editor of The Statesman. K. Ravi is Resident Editor of The Statesman, Bhubaneswar.

Sister Edition
Dainik Statesman, a daily Bengali newspaper, was launched in June 2004 and is published simultaneously in Kolkata and Siliguri.

Editorial incident

In February 2009, editor Ravindra Kumar and former publisher Anand Sinha of The Statesman were arrested on the charges of "hurting the religious feelings" of Muslims. BBC reported that the Muslims were upset with The Statesman for reproducing Johann Hari's article "Why should I respect these oppressive religions?" from the UK's The Independent daily in its February edition.

Rally sponsorship
The Statesman Vintage & Classic Car Rally has been held annually since 1964.

See also
Dainik Statesman
Indian English
List of newspapers in India by circulation
List of newspapers in the world by circulation

References

Further reading
 Merrill, John C. and Harold A. Fisher. The world's great dailies: profiles of fifty newspapers (1980) pp 294–97

External links
   
   

English-language newspapers published in India
Newspapers published in Kolkata
Newspapers published in Delhi
Publications established in 1875
1875 establishments in India